The 1890 Texas gubernatorial election was held to elect the Governor of Texas. Attorney General Jim Hogg was elected over Republican Webster Flanagan.

General election

Candidates
Webster Flanagan, former State Senator (Republican)
Ephraim Charles Heath, former State Representative and Rockwall County judge (Prohibition)
Jim Hogg, Attorney General of Texas (Democratic)

Results

References

1890
Texas
1890 Texas elections